Le baiser (The Kiss) is the fifth studio album by French new wave band, Indochine. It was released in 1990 and is the follow-up album to 7000 Danses.

Track listing
All lyrics by Nicola Sirkis.  All music by Dominique Nicolas.
 Le baiser - 4:10  (The Kiss)
 Des fleurs pour Salinger - 3:14 (Flowers for Salinger) 
 More - 7:03 
 Alertez Managua - 3:55 (Alert Managua)
 Les années bazar - 3:52 (The Bazaar Years) 
 Punishment Park - 3:50 
 Soudain l'été dernier, je suppose - 3:52 (Suddenly Last Summer, I Guess)
 Les plus mauvaises nuits - 3:47 (The Worst Nights)
 Persane Thème - 2:29 
 Tant de poussière - 4:35 (So Much Dust)
 La colline des roses - 3:57 (The Hill of Roses)

Personnel

Indochine
Nicola Sirkis: Vocals, Harmonica
Dominique Nicolas: Guitars, Bass, Synthesizers
Stephane Sirkis: Bass, Guitars, Synthesizers
Martin Hanlin: Drums, Percussion

Additional Personnel
Juliette Binoche: Additional Vocals on "Punishment Park"
Florence Agustin: Cello
Claire Julien de la Ferrière: Clarinet
Philippe Eidel: Piano, Synthesizers, Backing Vocals
Mammoud Tabrizi-Zadeh: Santoor, Kemenche

References

External links
 Detailed album information at www.indo-chine.org

1990 albums
Indochine (band) albums
Ariola Records albums
Albums produced by Philippe Eidel